Armada Dandenong Plaza is a major-regional shopping centre located in the heart of Dandenong built adjoining Myer Dandenong in 1989. Myer originally opened in Dandenong on November 4, 1974 as a four-level, standalone department store. It is approximately 30 kilometres south-east of the Melbourne CBD. The centre has two large food courts (one on level 1 and another outside Reading Cinemas on level 2). Level 3 has a large Fresh Food Hall outside Coles supermarket. Armada Dandenong Plaza is in close proximity to the Dandenong Market and also Dandenong Hub.

Retailers 
Armada Dandenong Plaza currently has  of floor space on three levels.

Major Anchors
Kmart
Aldi
Coles
Woolworths
Reading Cinemas

Minor Anchors
Daiso
TK Maxx
The Reject Shop
Rebel
Cotton On
Nando's

Former Anchors
Myer (closed 13 October 2013) 
Target (closed 9 July 2022)
Village Cinemas (closed in 2008)
Best & Less (closed in June 2014)
Trade Secret (replaced by TK Maxx)
JB Hi-Fi Home (relocated to Dandenong south)
 EB Games (closed in around somewhere in 2020)

References

External links

GPT Retail Portfolio

Shopping centres in Melbourne
Shopping malls established in 1989
1989 establishments in Australia
Dandenong, Victoria
Buildings and structures in the City of Greater Dandenong